Hanna–Ochler–Elder House, also known as the Hannah House, is a historic home located at Indianapolis, Marion County, Indiana.  It was built in 1859, and is a -story, five-bay, Italianate style brick dwelling with Greek Revival style design elements.  It has a lower two-story kitchen wing with gallery added in 1872.  The house has a low-pitched hipped roof with bracketed eaves.

It was added to the National Register of Historic Places in 1978.

References

Houses on the National Register of Historic Places in Indiana
Italianate architecture in Indiana
Greek Revival houses in Indiana
Houses completed in 1859
Houses in Marion County, Indiana
National Register of Historic Places in Marion County, Indiana
National Register of Historic Places in Indianapolis